is a railway station on the Kyoto Municipal Subway Karasuma Line in Kamigyo-ku, Kyoto, Japan.

Lines
 
 (Station Number: K05)

Layout
The station consists of one underground island platform serving two tracks.

Platforms

See also
 List of railway stations in Japan

References

Railway stations in Kyoto Prefecture
Railway stations in Japan opened in 1981